Aneela Mirza (born 8 October 1974) is a Danish singer based in the United Kingdom. She has found success as a member of the pop group Toy-Box and as a solo artist performing mononymously as Aneela.

She was part of the Danish pop group Toy-Box which enjoyed worldwide success in the late-1990s and early-2000s, selling over 4.5 million albums. The group released two albums of bubblegum dance music, Fantastic and Toy Ride, and had several hit singles including "Tarzan & Jane" and "Best Friend".

After the group's break-up, Aneela embarked on a solo career and released her first solo single, "Bombay Dreams", in 2005. The song was a collaboration with pop singer Arash with whom she worked on several other songs as well, including "Chori Chori" (which is set to the tune of Snow's song "Informer"). Apart from her solo career, Aneela has also produced and written for Danish artist Burhan G, R&B producer Saqib and many more.

Mirza is of Pakistani, Iranian and Indian descent, and grew up in Denmark and Pakistan.

Filmography 
 Bombay Dreams – 2004
 Bluffmaster! – 2005 – "Say Na Say Na"

Discography

Albums

As a member of Toy-Box
 Fantastic (1999)
 Toy Ride (2001)

Solo
 Mahi (2006)

Singles

References

External links
Anila Mirza
Chori Chori clip (captured in Poprad, Slovakia)

1974 births
Living people
Danish emigrants to England
Danish people of Pakistani descent
Danish people of Iranian descent
English-language singers from Denmark
Extensive Music artists
21st-century Danish  women singers